Bálint Lépes de Váraskeszi (c. 1570 – 26 April 1623) was a Hungarian prelate of the Roman Catholic Church, who served as bishop of several dioceses. He was the Archbishop of Kalocsa from 1619 to 1623. He also functioned as Royal Chancellor of Hungary between 1608 and 1623. He was a prominent figure of the Counter-Reformation in the Kingdom of Hungary.

References

Bibliography
 Markó, László: A magyar állam főméltóságai Szent Istvántól napjainkig - Életrajzi Lexikon p. 317.  (The High Officers of the Hungarian State from Saint Stephen to the Present Days - A Biographical Encyclopedia) (2nd edition); Helikon Kiadó Kft., 2006, Budapest; .

|-

|-

1570s births
1623 deaths
Bishops of Győr
Archbishops of Kalocsa
Bishops of Veszprém
Balint
17th-century Roman Catholic archbishops in Hungary
Bishops of Nitra